The 2020 Fresno State Bulldogs football team represented California State University, Fresno in the 2020 NCAA Division I FBS football season. The Bulldogs were led by first–year head coach Kalen DeBoer and played their games at Bulldog Stadium as a member of the Mountain West Conference.

On August 10, 2020, the Mountain West Conference suspended all fall sports competitions due to the COVID-19 pandemic.

On September 24, 2020, the Mountain West Conference resumed all fall sports competitions.

Previous season
They finished the 2019 season 4–8 and 2–6 in Mountain West play to finish in a three–way tie in fourth place in the West Division and did not qualify for a bowl game. Head coach Jeff Tedford resigned and was replaced by Kalen DeBoer.

Schedule
Fresno State had non-conference games scheduled against Colorado and Texas A&M. They were canceled due to the COVID-19 pandemic.

On November 19, the game vs. San Jose State scheduled for November 21 was canceled because of a positive COVID-19 test and contact tracing within the Fresno State program.

On November 22, the game vs. San Diego State scheduled for November 27 was canceled due to COVID-19 protocols within the Fresno State football program.

Game summaries

Hawaii

Colorado State

UNLV

Utah State

Nevada

New Mexico

References

Fresno State
Fresno State Bulldogs football seasons
Fresno State Bulldogs football